Michael Bird  (born 12 April 1958) is a British author and art historian. He was born in London and educated at Haberdashers' Aske's School and Merton College, Oxford. After teaching at Sherborne School he worked in publishing, including a stint on the editorial team of the Macmillan Dictionary of Art (now Oxford Art Online). Throughout the 1980s and 1990s, Bird published poetry, essays and reviews. His books on modern British art include monographs on the artists Sandra Blow (2005), Bryan Wynter (2010), Lynn Chadwick (2014) and George Fullard (2017),The St Ives Artists: A Biography of Place and Time (2008, 2nd edn. 2016) and Studio Voices: Art and Life in 20th-century Britain (2018). He has also written a history of art for children, Vincent's Starry Night and Other Stories (2016).

Bird has written for The Times, The Guardian, The Daily Telegraph, Modern Painters, Tate Etc and PN Review. His work for radio  includes contributions to the BBC arts programmes Kaleidoscope, Night Waves and The Essay, and features for BBC Radio 3 and 4, including The Wreck of the Alba (2009), based on a painting by Alfred Wallis, Lanyon's Last Flight (2011), The Flower Fields (2012) and Frost–Heron (2017).

Bird was National Life Stories Goodison Fellow in 2016. In 2018 he was appointed Royal Literary Fund Fellow at the University of Exeter.

Bird lives in Cornwall with his wife, the artist Felicity Mara.

Select bibliography

Books 

 Sandra Blow (2005). Lund Humphries. 
 The St Ives Artists: A Biography of Place and Time (2008). Lund Humphries. 
 Bryan Wynter (2010). Lund Humphries. 
 100 Ideas that Changed Art (2012). Laurence King Publishing. 
 Lynn Chadwick (2014). Lund Humphries. 
 Vincent's Starry Night and Other Stories: A Children's History of Art (2016). Laurence King Publishing. 
 George Fullard: Sculpture and Survival (2017). Gallery Pangolin. 
 Studio Voices: Art and Life in 20th-century Britain (2018). Lund Humphries/British Library. 
 Lynn Chadwick: A Sculptor on the International Stage (with contributions by Daniel Chadwick, Eva Chadwick, Sarah Marchant and Marin R. Sullivan) (2018). Scheidegger & Spiess. 
 Artists' Letters: Leonardo da Vinci to David Hockney (2019). White Lion Publishing.

Selected essays and articles 

 ‘The perception of symmetry’, Tate Etc.  (Spring 2004)
 'In character: Alexander Mackenzie and Landscape', Alexander Mackenzie (exhib. cat., London: Austin/Desmond Fine Art, 2007)
 ‘The transformed total: the constructions of Margaret Mellis’, Margaret Mellis (exhib. cat., London: Austin/Desmond Fine Art, 2008)
 ‘I have heard of your paintings: an artist in rehearsal’, Lisa Wright: The Histories (exhib. cat., London: Beardsmore Gallery/Roundhouse, 2008)
 ‘Myth and continuity: Peter Lanyon’s Porthmeor’, Porthmeor: A Lanyon Mural Rediscovered (exhib. cat., Bath: Victoria Art Gallery, 2008)
 ‘Questions of balance: Sandra Blow’, Sandra Blow (exhib. cat., Beaux Arts London, 2009)
 'Janet Leach, William Marshall, Jason Wason' (exhib. cat. essay on Jason Wason) (London: Austin Desmond Fine Art, 2011)
 'Introduction: Dressed in Human Form', The Sculpture of Kenneth Armitage, by James Scott and Claudia Milburn (Lund Humphries, 2016)  
 'Figures in the Post-war Landscape', Facing Fear: Giacometti / Chadwick (exhib. cat., Zwolle: Museum de Fundatie, 2018)

References

External links 
 Michael Bird website
 Interview with Michael Bird
 Article for Tate Etc
 Interview with Michael Bird, Guest Curator of Artists' Voices
 Interview about Artists' Letters
 Lecture at Saïd Business School, Oxford University

British art historians
1958 births
Living people
Alumni of Merton College, Oxford